The Minister of Trade and Industry in New Zealand is a former cabinet position (existing from 1972 to 1989) appointed by the Prime Minister to be in charge of matters of industrial and commercial growth and trade. In 1972 it was created, superseding the precious office of Minister of Industries and Commerce, but was distinct from the separate post of Minister of Overseas Trade. In 1989 the Trade and Industry portfolio was absorbed by the Minister of Commerce.

List of ministers
The following ministers held the office of Minister of Trade and Industry.

Key

Notes

References

Trade and Industry
Political office-holders in New Zealand